Afrosciadium is a genus of flowering plants belonging to the carrot family, Apiaceae. It was split from the genus Peucedanum in 2008 by P.J.D. Winter, et al.

Its native range is Tropical and Southern Africa.

Species:

 Afrosciadium abyssinicum (Vatke) P.J.D.Winter 
 Afrosciadium articulatum (C.C.Towns.) P.J.D.Winter
 Afrosciadium caffrum (Meisn.) P.J.D.Winter
 Afrosciadium dispersum (C.C.Towns.) P.J.D.Winter
 Afrosciadium englerianum (H.Wolff) P.J.D.Winter
 Afrosciadium eylesii (C.Norman) P.J.D.Winter
 Afrosciadium friesiorum (H.Wolff) P.J.D.Winter
 Afrosciadium gossweileri (C.Norman) P.J.D.Winter
 Afrosciadium harmsianum (H.Wolff) P.J.D.Winter
 Afrosciadium kerstenii (Engl.) P.J.D.Winter
 Afrosciadium lundense (Cannon) P.J.D.Winter
 Afrosciadium lynesii (C.Norman) P.J.D.Winter
 Afrosciadium magalismontanum (Sond.) P.J.D.Winter
 Afrosciadium natalense (Sond.) P.J.D.Winter
 Afrosciadium nyassicum (H.Wolff) P.J.D.Winter
 Afrosciadium platycarpum (Sond.) P.J.D.Winter
 Afrosciadium rhodesicum (Cannon) P.J.D.Winter
 Afrosciadium trisectum (C.C.Towns.) P.J.D.Winter

References

Apioideae
Apioideae genera